United Nations Security Council Resolution 421, adopted unanimously on December 9, 1977, after recalling Resolution 418, the Council decided to establish a committee to oversee the implementation of that resolution. It tasked the committee to report back on its observations and recommendations regarding ways in which the arms embargo could be made more effective against South Africa and to ask Member States as to how they are implementing the resolution.

Resolution 421 went on to call on all Member States to cooperate fully with the committee in the above respects, and to the Secretary-General to make appropriate arrangements to allow the committee to function.

See also
 List of United Nations Security Council Resolutions 401 to 500 (1976–1982)
 South Africa under apartheid

References
Text of the Resolution at undocs.org

External links
 

 0421
United Nations Security Council Resolution 421
 0421
United Nations Security Council sanctions regimes
December 1977 events